Emond is a surname, and may refer to:

Alexandre Émond, a Canadian judoka
Anne Émond, a film director and screenwriter
Bernard Émond, a Canadian director and screenwriter
Jean-Bernard Émond, a Canadian politician
Jean Emond, a professor of surgery
Linda Emond, an American actress
Martin Emond, a New Zealand cartoon illustrator and painter
Renaud Emond, a Belgian football player

French-language surnames